"Who Gon Stop Me" is a song by American hip hop recording artists Kanye West and Jay-Z, from their first collaborative album Watch the Throne (2011). The song is the ninth song on the official track list for the album. Music critics praised the song.

The song samples dubstep producer Flux Pavilion's song "I Can't Stop" throughout. It charted in the United States, South Korea and Canada.

Composition
Co-writer Verse Simmonds claimed for "Who Gon Stop Me" to be influenced by the U.K. style of electronic dance music known as dubstep and recalled immediately going to work on it with Sham "Sak Pase" Joseph, who produced the song along with West and additional producer Mike Dean. A sample of English dubstep producer Flux Pavilion's hit single "I Can't Stop", taken from his EP Lines in Wax and his mix album Circus One with Doctor P, is utilized for the hook and gnarled synths of the song. In April 2012, Pavilion spoke of being sampled by West and Jay-Z as it being a powerful thing for not only being recognized outside his genre, but by superstars.

In popular culture
Complex listed the track among their 25 pregame jams for NBA players. The song was featured in the 2013 film The Great Gatsby.

Critical reception

"Who Gon Stop Me" received general acclaim from music critics. Spin gave the song a positive review and described the hook in the song "This is something like a holocaust / Millions of our people lost," by adding that "He's making the point that inner-city violence, by the dictionary definition of the word ("a mass slaughter of people"), is a holocaust, but is never framed as such". Rolling Stone, similar to Spin, also stated that the song was an experimental track that featured a dubstep bass line and that it is flattering to West's vocal talents. Billboard described "Who Gon Stop Me" by saying "The Throne throws the middle finger to haters and hardships of the past. "Til I die/ I'mma f***in ball," West raps. Perfect song for wildin'." The Hollywood Reporter stated that the album also had a "dubstep-like" beat and described West and Jay-Z's verses by saying "It's unclear what Kanye's referring to by "our people." Jay-Z admits that he still likes Picasso, but now he also likes Rothko and Rilke. " The Guardian described the song as using "Romping, ravey synths, a big stomp without much give."

Commercial performance
Due to the hype around Watch the Throne, "Who Gon Stop Me" debuted on the Billboard Hot 100 at number 44, without actually being released as a single. The reason for the song's relatively high debut on the Billboard Hot 100 is because of the song's high digital performance. On the week of August 27, 2011, "Who Gon Stop Me" debuted on the Billboard Digital Songs chart at number 19, which was the second highest debut of the week only under Drake's single "Headlines" and the song also debuted at number 6 on the R&B/Hip-Hop Digital Song Sales chart. In its second week on the Hot 100 it dropped to number 79, and by the third week it exited the chart entirely. The song is the only non-single from Watch the Throne that managed to chart in the Top 50 on the Billboard Hot 100. The song performed similarly in Canada, debuting at number 60 on the Canadian Hot 100 the week of the album's release.

On April 10, 2015, the song was certified Gold in the US.

Credits and personnel
Produced by Sham "Sak Pase" Joseph and Kanye West
Additional production by Mike Dean
Recorded by Noah Goldstein at (The Mercer) Hotel, New York
Mixed by Anthony Kilhoffer at (The Mercer) Hotel, New York
Additional vocals: Mr Hudson

Charts

Certifications

References

2011 songs
Dubstep songs
Jay-Z songs
Kanye West songs
Song recordings produced by Kanye West
Song recordings produced by Mike Dean (record producer)
Songs written by Jay-Z
Songs written by Kanye West
Songs written by Flux Pavilion
Songs written by Mike Dean (record producer)
Songs written by Verse Simmonds